The 2019 AFC Champions League group stage was played from 4 March to 29 May 2019. A total of 32 teams competed in the group stage to decide the 16 places in the knockout stage of the 2019 AFC Champions League. The postponement of Group A fixture between Zob Ahan and Al-Nassr made the group stage conclude a week behind schedule.

Draw

The draw for the group stage was held on 22 November 2018, 16:30 MYT (UTC+8), at the AFC House in Kuala Lumpur, Malaysia. The 32 teams were drawn into eight groups of four: four groups each in the West Region (Groups A–D) and the East Region (Groups E–H). Teams from the same association could not be drawn into the same group.

The mechanism of the draw was as follows:
For the West Region, there was no associations draw due to country protection. A draw was held for each of the four associations with more than one direct entrant (United Arab Emirates, Saudi Arabia, Qatar, Iran) to determine for each team their group positions:
The three direct entrants of the United Arab Emirates were drawn to positions A1, B2, or C3, while the play-off winners West 1 (which their play-off team may advance from) were allocated to position D4.
The three direct entrants of Saudi Arabia were drawn to positions B1, C2, or D3, while the play-off winners West 2 (which their play-off team may advance from) were allocated to position A4.
The two direct entrants of Qatar were drawn to positions C1 or D2, while the play-off winners West 3 and 4 (which their play-off teams may advance from) were drawn to positions A3 or B4.
The two direct entrants of Iran were drawn to positions D1 or C4.
The direct entrants of Uzbekistan and Iraq were allocated to positions B3 and A2 respectively.
For the East Region, a draw was held for the two associations with three direct entrants (South Korea, China) to determine the order of associations. After the associations draw, a draw was held for each of the four associations with more than one direct entrant (South Korea, China, Japan, Australia) to determine for each team their group positions:
The three direct entrants of the first association drawn (South Korea or China) were drawn to positions E1, F2, or G3, while the play-off winners East 1 or 2 (which their play-off team may advance from) were allocated to position H4.
The three direct entrants of the second association drawn (South Korea or China) were drawn to positions F1, G2, or H3, while the play-off winners East 1 or 2 (which their play-off team may advance from) were allocated to position E4.
The two direct entrants of Japan were drawn to positions G1 or H2, while the play-off winners East 3 and 4 (which their play-off teams may advance from) were either allocated to F4 and E3 respectively (if South Korea were the first association drawn), or drawn to positions E3 or F4 (if China were the first association drawn).
The two direct entrants of Australia were either drawn to positions H1 or F3 (if South Korea were the first association drawn, or if China were the first association drawn and the play-off winners East 4 were drawn to position E3), or positions H1 or E2 (if China were the first association drawn and the play-off winners East 3 were drawn to position E3).
The direct entrants of Thailand and Malaysia were allocated to either positions G4 and E2 (if South Korea were the first association drawn), positions F3 and G4 (if China were the first association drawn and the play-off winners East 4 were drawn to position E3), or positions E2 and G4 (if China were the first association drawn and the play-off winners East 3 were drawn to position E3) respectively.

The following 32 teams entered into the group stage draw, which included the 24 direct entrants and the eight winners of the play-off round of the qualifying play-offs, whose identity was not known at the time of the draw.

Format

In the group stage, each group was played on a home-and-away round-robin basis. The winners and runners-up of each group advanced to the round of 16 of the knockout stage.

Tiebreakers

The teams were ranked according to points (3 points for a win, 1 point for a draw, 0 points for a loss). If tied on points, tiebreakers were applied in the following order (Regulations Article 10.5):
Points in head-to-head matches among tied teams;
Goal difference in head-to-head matches among tied teams;
Goals scored in head-to-head matches among tied teams;
Away goals scored in head-to-head matches among tied teams;
If more than two teams were tied, and after applying all head-to-head criteria above, a subset of teams were still tied, all head-to-head criteria above were reapplied exclusively to this subset of teams;
Goal difference in all group matches;
Goals scored in all group matches;
Penalty shoot-out if only two teams playing each other in the last round of the group were tied;
Disciplinary points (yellow card = 1 point, red card as a result of two yellow cards = 3 points, direct red card = 3 points, yellow card followed by direct red card = 4 points);
Association ranking.

Schedule
The schedule of each matchday was as follows.
Matches in the West Region were played on Mondays and Tuesdays. Two groups were played on each day, with the following groups played on Mondays:
Matchdays 1 and 2: Groups A and B
Matchday 3: Groups A and C
Matchday 4: Groups B and D
Matchdays 5 and 6: Groups C and D
Matches in the East Region were played on Tuesdays and Wednesdays. Two groups were played on each day, with the following groups played on Tuesdays:
Matchdays 1 and 2: Groups E and F
Matchday 3: Groups E and G
Matchday 4: Groups F and H
Matchdays 5 and 6: Groups G and H

Groups

Group A

Group B

Group C

Group D

Group E

Group F

Group G

Group H

Notes

References

External links
, the-AFC.com
AFC Champions League 2019, stats.the-AFC.com

2
March 2019 sports events in Asia
April 2019 sports events in Asia
May 2019 sports events in Asia